Velilla de Cinca or Vilella de Cinca is a municipality located in the province of Huesca, Aragon, Spain. According to the 2004 census (INE), the municipality has a population of 441 inhabitants.

See also
Bajo Cinca/Baix Cinca

References

Municipalities in the Province of Huesca